The LDS Stake Office Building in Paris, Idaho was built in 1910.  It was listed on the National Register of Historic Places in 1982.

It is a one-and-a-half-story building which is approximately square in plan.  Its exterior is smooth buff-colored brick.  Its design has elements of bungalow, Prairie, and commercial Romanesque Revival architectural styles.

It was the local stake office which provided regional administration of the Church of Jesus Christ of Latter-day Saints (LDS Church).

See also
Bear Lake Stake Tabernacle, also NRHP-listed

References

Properties of religious function on the National Register of Historic Places in Idaho
Victorian architecture in Idaho
Late 19th and Early 20th Century American Movements architecture
Office buildings completed in 1910
Bear Lake County, Idaho